Baxter Humby (born October 26, 1974) is a former Canadian kickboxer and stuntman known as "The One Armed Bandit” due to his missing right hand, which was amputated at birth just below his elbow after becoming entangled with the umbilical cord. In 2012, he was nominated for an ESPY Award for  Best Male Athlete with a Disability.

Early life
Humby was born on October 26, 1974 in Gillam, Manitoba, Canada. Humby’s father (who died when he was eight), was a boxer in the Canadian army, and taught him how to box at age four. He began training in Tae Kwan Do at the age of 17.

Career

Kickboxing
Humby won the Canadian Super Welterweight Kickboxing Championship in 1996. He then moved to California to pursue a professional kickboxing career and went on to win several titles including the International Muay Thai Council World Super Welterweight Championship, WBC Super Welterweight National Championship, IKKC USA Kickboxing Championship, IMTC World Middleweight Championship and IKBA International Kickboxing Championship.

Films
In 2004, Humby travelled to China to star in the film "One Arm Hero". It was produced by martial arts film star Carter Wong (Big Trouble in Little China) and directed by Li Man Sing.

Baxter Humby worked as a stunt double for Tobey Maguire in the film Spider-Man 3, during a fight scene in which Spider-Man punches through Sandman's chest.

Humby played the role of Eduardo Romero, a corrupt Mexican official, on the television series The Shield. 

He was featured in the music video of the song "Renegades" by X Ambassadors.

In 2020, Humby was a zombie on Fear the Walking Dead. He also worked as a stuntman in the film Army of the Dead starring former professional wrestler Dave Bautista.

Kickboxing record 

|-  bgcolor="#CCFFCC"
| 2011-09-02 || Win||align=left| Zidov Dominik || Muaythai Premier League: Round 1 || Long Beach, California, USA || KO (spinning back kick) || 1 || 1:40
|-
! style=background:white colspan=9 |
|-
|-  bgcolor="#FFBBBB"
| 2009-08-30 || Loss ||align=left| Xu Yan || WCK World Championship Muay Thai || Las Vegas, Nevada, USA || Decision (split) || 3 || 3:00
|-
|-  bgcolor="#CCFFCC"
| 2009-07-25 || Win ||align=left| Chike Lindsay || WCK Muay Thai || Las Vegas, Nevada, USA || Decision (split) || 5 || 3:00
|-
|-  bgcolor="#FFBBBB"
| 2007-09-08 || Loss ||align=left| Mickaël Piscitello || WBC Muay Thai Presents: World Championship Muay Thai || Gardena, CA || TKO (Referee Stoppage) || 3 ||
|-
! style=background:white colspan=9 |
|-
|-
|-  bgcolor="#CCFFCC"
| 2004-09-11 || Win ||align=left| Alessandro Ricci || || Las Vegas, Nevada, USA || Decision (unanimous) || 5 || 3:00
|-
|-  bgcolor="#FFBBBB"
| 2002-06-01 || Loss ||align=left| John Wayne Parr || World Championship Kickboxing || Bernalillo, New Mexico, United States || TKO || 3 || 
|-  bgcolor="#CCFFCC"
| 2001-06-30 || Win ||align=left| David Blocker || Draka || Las Vegas, Nevada, USA || KO || 1 || 0:56
|-
|-
| colspan=9 | Legend:

References

External links
 
 

Canadian male kickboxers
Welterweight kickboxers
Canadian Muay Thai practitioners
Canadian amputees
1974 births
Living people
Sportspeople from Winnipeg
Canadian emigrants to the United States